The Communauté de communes de Seine-École is a former federation of municipalities (communauté de communes) in the Seine-et-Marne département and in the Île-de-France région of France. It was created in April 1974. It was merged into the Communauté d'agglomération Melun Val de Seine in January 2016.

Composition 
The Communauté de communes de Seine-École comprised 2 communes:
Pringy
Saint-Fargeau-Ponthierry

See also
Communes of the Seine-et-Marne department

References 

Former commune communities of Seine-et-Marne